The women's 50 kg (110 lbs) Semi-Contact category at the W.A.K.O. World Championships 2007 in Coimbra was the lightest of the female Light-Contact tournaments falling between bantamweight and featherweight when compared to Full-Contact's weight classes. There were thirteen women from two continents (Europe and North America) taking part in the competition.  Each of the matches was three rounds of two minutes each and were fought under Semi-Contact rules.   

As there were too few women for a tournament designed for sixteen, three of the fighters had byes through to the quarter finals.  The tournament gold medalist was Hungary's Reka Krempf who beat Great Britain's Sharon Gill in the final on points.  Defeated semi-finalists Eugenia Kaskantiri from Greece and Fadeeva Svetlana from Russia took bronze.

Results

Key

See also
List of WAKO Amateur World Championships
List of WAKO Amateur European Championships
List of female kickboxers

References

External links
 WAKO World Association of Kickboxing Organizations Official Site

Kickboxing events at the WAKO World Championships 2007 Coimbra
2007 in kickboxing
Kickboxing in Portugal